Edwin Robin Fitton (1928 in Leeds – 2 May 1970 in Adenau ) was a Grand Prix motorcycle road racer from Leeds, West Yorkshire. His best season was in 1968 when he finished the year in fourth place in the 500cc world championship. Fitton was killed at the Nürburgring during practice for the 1970 West German Grand Prix.

References 

1970 deaths
Sportspeople from Leeds
British motorcycle racers
English motorcycle racers
350cc World Championship riders
500cc World Championship riders
Motorcycle racers who died while racing
Sport deaths in Germany
Place of birth missing
1928 births